The R748 road is a regional road in County Wicklow, Ireland. It travels from Carnew to the R747 road, via Kilcavan, Coolboy and Coolafancy.

References

Regional roads in the Republic of Ireland
Roads in County Wicklow